The Metlife Foundation Award for Medical Research in Alzheimer's Disease were awarded annually from 1986 to 2016 to recognize scientific contributions toward a better understanding of the underlying causes, prevention, and treatments of Alzheimer's disease. The awards were endowed by the Metlife Foundation and administered by The American Federation for Aging Research.

Each of the winners received a personal award of US$50,000 and US$200,000 in research funds to further their research.

Recipients

Source:

See also

 List of medicine awards
 List of neuroscience awards

References

Medicine awards
Neuroscience awards
Awards established in 1988
American science and technology awards